Lee Phillip (born 26 May 1981), is a Korean-American actor. He is best known for his roles in South Korean television series such as The Legend (2007) and Secret Garden (2010).

Career
Using the stage name Lee Phillip, he began his entertainment career in South Korea as a model, then made his acting debut in the 2007 fantasy series The Legend. For his performance as the masked warrior Cheoro, Lee was nominated as Best New Actor at the 2007 MBC Drama Awards and the 2008 Baeksang Arts Awards.

More supporting roles followed; he played a lawyer in the crime drama The Slingshot (2009), and a martial arts choreographer in the romantic dramedy Secret Garden (2010). In 2012, Lee was cast as a Goryeo-era doctor in the period drama Faith, his third time to work with screenwriter Song Ji-na after The Legend and The Slingshot. But he had to leave the series before its finale due to an eye injury.

Filmography

Awards and nominations

References

External links
  
 
 

Living people
1981 births
South Korean male television actors
American male actors of Korean descent
South Korean male models
Boston University alumni
George Washington University School of Engineering and Applied Science alumni
People from Washington, D.C.